Cinolazepam (marketed under the brand name Gerodorm) is a drug which is a benzodiazepine derivative. It possesses anxiolytic, anticonvulsant, sedative and skeletal muscle relaxant properties.
Due to its strong sedative properties, it is primarily used as a hypnotic.

It was patented in 1978 and came into medical use in 1992. Cinolazepam is not approved for sale in the United States or Canada.

References

External links
 Inchem.org - Cinolazepam

Secondary alcohols
Benzodiazepines
Chloroarenes
Fluoroarenes
GABAA receptor positive allosteric modulators
Hypnotics
Lactams
Nitriles